Thulasizwe Mbuyane (born 13 August 1983 in Mamelodi) is a retired South African footballer , who played for Premier Soccer League clubs Free State Stars, Orlando Pirates and Mpumalanga Black Aces and the South African national squad as a midfielder.

Mbuyane was traded to Orlando Pirates from Free State Stars in a swap deal taking Paulos Masehe in the opposite direction during the closed season before the 2008/09 Premier Soccer League season.

On 21 January 2014, it was announced that Mbuyane joined Mpumalanga Black Aces on a two-and-a-half-year deal, ending a six-season stint at Orlando Pirates.

International career
Thulasizwe Mbuyane played for the national team in March 2008 when he was called in as a substitute.

International goals

Honours
Orlando Pirates 
 Premier Soccer League
Winners : 2010/2011, 2011/2012
Runners up : 2008/2009
Nedbank Cup: 2011
Telkom knockout: 2011
MTN 8: 2010, 2011
 CAF Champions League
Runners up : 2013
 Carling Blaclk label Cup: 2010, 2011, 2014

References

External links

1983 births
Living people
Soccer players from Pretoria
South African soccer players
Free State Stars F.C. players
Orlando Pirates F.C. players
Mpumalanga Black Aces F.C. players
Royal Eagles F.C. players
Association football midfielders
South Africa international soccer players
South African Premier Division players
National First Division players

ar:إيكسيلنت واللازا